Zac, Zach, Zack, Zak, or Zachary Thompson may refer to:

Zac Thompson (born 1993), English footballer
Zach Thompson (American football) (born 1991), American gridiron football player
Zach Thompson (baseball) (born 1993), American right-handed baseball pitcher
Zack Thompson (born 1997), American left-handed baseball pitcher
Zak Thompson (born 1983), American soccer player

See also
Zach Thomas (disambiguation)